The 1942 Spence Field Fliers football team represented Spence Air Base during the 1942 college football season.  Under Lieutenant R. I. Roberts, the Fliers compiled at least a 0–4 record, and were outscored by their opponents by at least a total of 134 to 6.  A lot of information on the 1942 Spence Army Air Field team is unknown, and there are only scattered primary sources that outline the season and results for the football team.  A few games can be verified as cancelled because teams like the 29th Infantry were already fighting in Europe by the time they were scheduled to play the air base, but others are completely unknown.  Another game that is yet to be verified by any primary sources was against Jacksonville NAS on December 5th.

Schedule

References

 
Spence Field
Spence Field Fliers football